The United States Centers for Disease Control and Prevention has data on drug overdose death rates and totals. Over 1,106,000 US residents died from drug overdoses from 1968 to 2020. Over 932,000 from 1999 through 2020. Over 91,000 in 2020. 28 people out of every 100,000 died from drug overdoses in 2020 in the US. Around 108,900 people died in 2021. Opioids were involved in 70.6% (nearly 50,000) of the nearly 71,000 deaths in 2019.

Around 106,800 people died in the 12-month period ending September 30, 2022, at a rate of 293 deaths per day.

1968–2020 overdose death rates and totals 

The numbers at the source for the table below are continually updated. So the numbers in the table below may be slightly different.

Overdose death rates by state. Map and timeline 
See: List of U.S. state and territory abbreviations.

Asterisk (*) indicates Category:Health in STATE link in table below.

Overdose death counts by state over time 
Overall US totals by year, followed by breakdown by state by year.

Yearly overdose death totals by drug 

Concerning the data in the charts below (in this section and the following sections) deaths from the various drugs add up to more than the yearly overdose death total because multiple drugs are involved in many of the deaths.

Opioid overdose death rates and totals. Many charts 

Of the 70,200 overdose deaths in the US in 2017, opioids were involved in 47,600. This is an increase from 2016 where over 64,000 died from drug overdose, and opioids were involved in over 42,000. In 2017, the five states with the highest rates of death due to drug overdose were West Virginia (57.8 per 100,000), Ohio (46.3 per 100,000), Pennsylvania (44.3 per 100,000), Kentucky (37.2 per 100,000), and New Hampshire (37.0 per 100,000).

Overdose death rates by race and ethnicity. Timeline

Overdose death rates by sex. Timeline

See also
List of deaths from drug overdose and intoxication 
Adulterants
Alcohol intoxication
Diseases of despair
Drug interactions
Responsible drug use

References

Further reading 

Opioid Overdose Deaths by Race/Ethnicity. Kaiser Family Foundation.
Opioid Overdose Deaths by Type of Opioid. Kaiser Family Foundation.

Drug overdose
Medical emergencies
US
Drug culture
Suicide methods
Substance-related disorders